Nanjing Agricultural University (NAU) is a public research university located in Nanjing, Jiangsu province, China. It is funded by the Ministry of Education of China as part of the nation's Double First Class University Plan and former Project 211 for leading national universities. It is also a designated Chinese state Double First Class University identified by the Ministry of Education.

Nanjing Agricultural University is a leading institution in agriculture-related disciplines of China and around the world. It was ranked 301st-400th globally by the 2021 Academic Ranking of World Universities (ARWU), and the University of St Andrews (UK) in the same range. It also achieved 2nd in Veterinary Sciences, 3rd in Agricultural Sciences, and 6th in Food Science and Technology in the 2021 Global Ranking of Academic Subjects by ARWU.

Faculties and colleges

Faculty of Plant Science

 College of Agriculture
 College of Plant Protection
 College of Horticulture

Faculty of Animal Science
 College of Veterinary Medicine  
 College of Animal Science & Technology   
 College of Prataculture College of Aquaculture

Faculty of Biology and Environment
 College of Resources & Environmental Sciences    
 College of Life Sciences

Faculty of Food and Engineering
 College of Food Science & Technology   
 College of Engineering   
 College of Information Science & Technology

Faculty of Social Science
 College of Economics & Management
 College of Public Administration
 College of Humanities & Social Sciences
 College of Finance
 College of Rural Development

General education
 College of Foreign Studies   
 Department of General Education on Political Science   
 Department of Physical Education

Featured graduate programs 
 Agricultural Economics & Management
 Agricultural Entomology & Pest Control
 Clinical Veterinary Medicine
 Crop Cultivation & Farming
 Crop Genetics & Breeding
 Food Science
 Land Resources & Management
 Pesticide Science
 Plant Nutrition
 Plant Pathology
 Preventive Veterinary Medicine
 Soil Science
 Theoretical Veterinary Medicine
 Vegetable Science

Research facilities 

 Crop Genetics & Germplasm Enhancement
 Meat Quality and Safety Control
 Soybean Improvement
 Information Agriculture
 National Key Engineering Center for Organic-based Fertilizers

NAU journals 
 Journal of Nanjing Agricultural University  
 Chinese Agricultural Education  
 Journal of Nanjing Agricultural University (Social Science) 
 Animal Husbandry and Veterinary Medicine  
 Institution of Chinese Agricultural Civilization  
 Horticulture Research

References

External links
  南京农业大学 http://www.njau.edu.cn  Official website 
Nanjing Agricultural University (NAU)  official website 

Universities and colleges in Nanjing
Agricultural universities and colleges in China
Project 211